Herbert P. Bix (born 1938) is an American historian. He wrote Hirohito and the Making of Modern Japan, an account of the Japanese Emperor and the events which shaped modern Japanese imperialism, which won the Pulitzer Prize for General Nonfiction in 2001.

Bix was born in Boston and attended the University of Massachusetts Amherst. He earned the PhD in history and Far Eastern languages from Harvard University. He was a founding member of the Committee of Concerned Asian Scholars. For several decades, he has written about modern and contemporary Japanese history in the United States and Japan.

He has taught at many universities, including Hosei University in Japan as of 1986 and 1990, and Hitotsubashi University as of 2001. As of 2013 he is Professor Emeritus in History and Sociology at Binghamton University.

His book 'Peasant Protest in Japan, 1590–1884' was hailed as 'a sensitive rendering of the actions of great masses of people' and a superior 'Marxist history'.

Selected works

 Peasant Protest in Japan, 1590–1884.  New Haven Conn.: Yale University Press, 1986.
 "Hiroshima in History and Memory: A Symposium, Japan's Delayed Surrender: A Reinterpretation." Diplomatic History 19, no. 2 (1995): pp. 197–225.
 Remembering the Nanking Massacre
 Hirohito and the Making of Modern Japan

References

External links 
 Bix: Hirohito decision led to later problems 
  - review of Hirohito and the Making of Modern Japan
 

 
Bix and his Hirohito: On the Use and Misuse of Sources  George Akita, The Asiatic Society of Japan, 2003-11-03

1938 births
Living people
Pulitzer Prize for General Non-Fiction winners
Historians of Japan
Binghamton University faculty
University of Massachusetts Amherst alumni
Harvard Graduate School of Arts and Sciences alumni
Date of birth missing (living people)
20th-century American male writers
21st-century American male writers
20th-century American historians
21st-century American historians
20th-century American non-fiction writers
21st-century American non-fiction writers
American male non-fiction writers